Rudna  is a village (former town) in Lubin County, Lower Silesian Voivodeship, in south-western Poland. It is the seat of the administrative district (gmina) called Gmina Rudna.

The village was originally called Nowa Ruda (New Rudna) - Old Polish ruda meaning ore⁣ – to distinguish it from the neighbouring small village of Stara Rudna (Old Rudna). Originated about 1280, it was not mentioned before 1347 in a deed of Charles IV of Luxemburg, at this time King of Bohemia, as a town within the Duchy of Ścinawa (Steinau). 

After World War II, the village lost its town rights and became part of the now-defunct Legnica Voivodeship.

The village has a population of 1,300.

Notable residents
 Hymn-writer Johann Heermann (1585-1647)
 Heinz-Gerhard Vogt (1911–1945), Luftwaffe fighter ace

References

Rudna
Former populated places in Lower Silesian Voivodeship